Eugoa trilacunata is a moth of the family Erebidae first described by Jeremy Daniel Holloway in 2001. It is found on Borneo. The habitat ranges from lowland areas to the upper montane zone.

The length of the forewings is 9–12 mm for males and 9–11 mm for females.

References

Moths described in 2001
Nudariina
Moths of Borneo